Blennidus blairi is a species of ground beetle in the subfamily Pterostichinae. It was described by Vandyke in 1953.

References

Blennidus
Beetles described in 1953